Mukhino is a rural locality (a selo) and the administrative center of Mukhinsky Selsoviet of Shimanovsky District, Amur Oblast, Russia. The population was 850 as of 2018. There are 18 streets.

Geography 
Mukhino is located 62 km northwest of Shimanovsk (the district's administrative centre) by road. Mukhinskaya is the nearest rural locality.

References 

Rural localities in Shimanovsky District